Adnan Hamidović (born 31 May 1982), better known by his stage name Frenkie, is a Bosnian rapper from Tuzla. The themes present in his music are often concerned with the political situation in Bosnia, as well as traditional hip-hop subject matter such as battle rapping and pop culture. He was one of the pioneers for graffiti and hip hop culture in Bosnia. As of 2022, he has recorded seven successful full-length albums to date: Odličan CD (2005),  Povratak Cigana (2007), Protuotrov (2009), Troyanac (2012), Putanja (2016) recorded in Berlin,Egzil (2017) recorded in Tokyo, album 2020(2019) recorded in Los Angeles, and  Stari Frenkie (2021). He also released extended plays Pokreni se (2008)  (2016), #DNA ep with Billain (2014), and a Bosnian only released album DOSTA! (2006).

Frenkie is also a member of the crew Disciplinska Komisija which includes Edo Maajka, HZA, Mire and Dj Soul. As of 2016. he is performing with his producer Indigo and the Sarajevo based rapper Kontra.

Life and music career

Early life
Adnan Hamidović was born in Bijeljina on 31 May 1982, where he has lived until 1992, when the Bosnian War started. After escaping the war, he settled with his family in Nürnberg, Germany until 1998. There he was first introduced to hip-hop culture, and he started to make hip-hop music and do graffiti. His first rap lyrics were in German. German hip-hop has influenced his style of rap throughout his career and he remains influenced by it. After returning to Bosnia, he went to Tuzla and continued with his graffiti, making him one of the first to make hip-hop related graffiti art after the war.

Early career
In 1999, with the beginning of the station Fmjam on Radio Kameleon, he befriended DJ Soul and Erol, who started Fmjam and the first hip-hop demo singles. Frenkie, Koma, Ady started the group "Prljavi Anđeli" (Dirty Angels).

Then later that same year, "Disciplinska Komisija" (DK) was formed. At the time of the formation the members were: spearhead of the group Edo Maajka, Frenkie, Hamaz, Mire, Koma and their DJ Soul. Edo Maajka released his popular album "Slusaj Mater" and started tours and concerts, during which he was joined by Frenkie. Frenkie is known for his fast rapping and energy. On Edo Maajka's second studio album "No Sikiriki", Frenkie is featured on two songs, establishing himself even more.

Recent activity
Frenkie's first album, Odličan CD, was released in 2005. It included the singles "Bruce Lee Rap" with Baby Dooks and "Raise" with Defence. Frenkie's second album, DOSTA!, featuring his beat maker King Mire from Brčko, was released in June 2006 and was dedicated to the movement of the same name, which is gaining popularity in Bosnia. Singles from the album include "Rat Savezu" which was dedicated to the Bosnian Soccer Fans "BHFANATICOS" in their war against the corrupt Bosnian Football Federation; Frenkie has released a video clip for this hit song. He has also released a video for "Mr Policeman". In 2007, radio station 202 was fined 5,000 euros by the Bosnian organization RAK for Frenkie's song "Mr. Policeman", a song talking about corrupt police forces. After that fine, Frenkie released a song in response to RAK on FMJam called "Massiv", which criticizes and mocks this institution. The title track of his album, Povratak Cigana (2007), was released as its first single on FMJAM's website. It features Hamza, Frenkie's long time friend.

In addition to his solo work, Frenkie has featured on many Disciplinska Komisija songs such as "America 2" and "Ustaj", and on Edo Maajka's albums on "Ozezi", "Ne-Mo-Zes" and "Stvoren Za Rep".

In the summer of 2008, Frenkie's song 'Soundtrack' (from the album Odličan CD) was used in the 2008 Marvel Studios film The Incredible Hulk. The song was used in during a very rough cab driving scene featuring Edward Norton and Liv Tyler.

Frenkie recorded a song with Masta Ace called Živili. It was released on Frenkie's 2009 album Protuotrov.

Frenkie is part of the Diversidad crew. Diversidad: A Unique European Urban Experience has a collective album gathering twenty rappers, beat-makers and DJs, which includes Frenkie.

After short tours, Frenkie released the EP #DNA with producer Billain in 2014. It was the first album in Bosnia that was released on vinyl.

To mark the 10 year anniversary of his debut album, Frenkie released the compilation album Reexperience, which featured his greatest hits as well as new songs and remixed songs.

In September 2016, Frenkie, Kontra and producer Indigo released a collaborative album entitled Putanja. The album was recorded in Red Bull Studios in Berlin and entirely produced by Indigo.

On 10 September 2019, Frenkie had a public forum on which he presented his new book Koraci (Steps); it was held in reading rooms of City Library of Zenica, as a part of fourth dokuMfest (only Bosnian festival of documentaries). He also released a book called Lack-Made in Bosnia which is documenting his graffiti career.

On 8 November 2019, Frenkie announced a new album entitled 20/20 (made in collaboration with Kontra and Indigo and worked in Los Angeles based Red Bull Music Studios / Red Bull Camp Stewart);klix.ba its publishing date is 20 December 2019 and marks 20-years anniversary of FM JAM crew existence. 20/20 has 12 songs, some videos and a short documentary, and is a third Kontra and Indigo joint project with Frenkie—first two being Berlin and Tokyo. Album mastering was done by respected James Musshorn, and studio engineer was Henry D'Ambrosio; recording finished on 1 October 2019 (departure for the United States was on 8 September 2019 from Spain, where crew in Lloret de Mar held their first Spain concert that day, the day described as the beginning of the new album project).

Discography

Filmography

DocumentariesWho the Fuck is Frenkie (came out with his album Protuotrov, 2009) Soul train'' (came out 2015)

References

External links

News Magazine Frenkie - news, lyrics, pictures, reviews, biography, videos, best songs, discography, concerts, gossip, pictures and tour dates

 Interview
Amazon Album Amazon.com: Odlican CD: Frenkie: MP3 Downloads
Interview in English Frenkie Interview for hip-Hopkings.com | Facebook

1982 births
Living people
People from Bijeljina
Bosnia and Herzegovina musicians
Bosnia and Herzegovina rappers
Hayat Production artists
MTV Europe Music Award winners